Dithiopyr is a preemergent herbicide for crabgrass control in turf and ornamental grasses.  It is effective on 45 grassy and broadleaf weeds.  Dithiopyr inhibits root growth of susceptible weeds as well as turf grass and thus should be used only on established turf with a well-developed root system.  Its duration of efficacy is approximately 4 months, so lawns should not be reseeded during this time frame following application of the chemical.  Dithiopyr acts primarily as a preemergent herbicide but can also be used in early postemergent control of crabgrass.

It is an ingredient in many products including Dimension from Dow AgroSciences.

Mode of Action 
Dithiopyr acts as a root growth inhibitor, causing cessation of root elongation and inhibition of mitotic cell division.  It inhibits formation of microtubules and spindle organizing centers.  Dithiopyr may alter microtubule polymerization and stability by "interacting with microtubule associated proteins or microtubule organizing centers rather than interaction directly with tubulin."  Mitotic cells are arrested in late prometaphase.  Cell entry into mitosis is unaffected.

Synthesis

References

Preemergent herbicides
Pyridines
Organofluorides
Trifluoromethyl compounds
Microtubule inhibitors
Thioesters